The following is a list of cemeteries in Germany.

Baden-Württemberg

 Königsfeld im Schwarzwald, God's Acre, the Moravian Graveyard
 Freiburg, Friedhof Günterstal, Burial site of Sepp Allgeier, Walter Eucken and Hans Filbinger
 Freiburg, Burial and memorial to 1664 victims of the 1944 air raid
 Freiburg, Alter Friedhof,  Consecrated in 1683, one of Germany's oldest cemeteries
 Heidelberg, Bergfriedhof
 Meersburg, Städtischer Friedhof, Burial site of Annette von Droste-Hülshoff, Franz Anton Mesmer and Fritz Mauthner
 Tübingen:
 Stadtfriedhof, Burial site of Ludwig Uhland, Friedrich Silcher, Friedrich Hölderlin, Carlo Schmid and Kurt Georg Kiesinger
 Überlingen, Burial site of Wera Frydtberg und Fred Raymond

Bavaria (Bayern)
 Andechs, Kloster Andechs und Wittelsbacher Friedhof. Burial site of the Wittelsbachs
 Ansbach, Stadtfriedhof, Burial site of Kaspar Hauser and Johann Peter Uz
 Ansbach, St. Gumbertus Abbey, Burial site of some princes of the Hohenzollern family and of Maximilian Emanuel of Württemberg-Winnental
 Aschaffenburg, Friedhof, Burial site of Clemens Brentano
 Aschau im Chiemgau, Burial site of Hans Clarin
 Augsburg, Protestantischer Friedhof, Burial site of Karl Albert Gollwitzer and Anna Barbara von Stetten
 Bad Hindelang, Burial site of Gustl Gstettenbaur, Sepp Rist and Carla Rust
 Bad Wiessee, Burial site of Katharina de Bruyn, Hans Carste, Josef Ertl, Franz Grothe, Ludwig Marcuse and Berta Morena
 Bayreuth, Bayreuth Friedhof Burial site of Richard Wagner, Franz Liszt and Jean Paul amongst others
 Bechhofen (Central Franconia), Jewish Cemetery
 Dachau, Burial site of Isebil Sturm, August Peter Waldenmaier and Ignatius Taschner
 Feldafing, Burial site of Hans Baur and Heinrich Knote
 Feldkirchen, Burial site of Ruth Drexel
 Flintsbach, Burial site of Werner Stocker
 Freising, Burial site of Karl Obermayr and Roider Jackl
 Gmund am Tegernsee, Burial site of Helga Anders, Peter Boenisch, Willy Bogner, Sr., Ludwig Erhard and Siegfried Lindner
 Grassau, Burial site of Willy Reichert
 Grünwald, Burial site of Jan Alverdes, Wolfgang Becker, Lothar Brühne, Walter Carnuth, Erik Charell, Lil Dagover and Georg Witt, Erich Engels, Carl Ernst Englert, Hertha Feiler, Jürgen Feindt, Manfred Fürst, Jakob Geis, Kurt Großkurth, Jan Groth, Margarethe Haagen, Richard Häussler, Ullrich Haupt, Joachim Hess, Käthe Hestler-Itter, Carola Höhn, Herbert Jarczyk, Horst Jüssen, Joseph Keilberth, Franz Klarwein, Richard König, Oscar Lepka-Marion, Mario Lerch-Rossi, Werner Lieven, Theo Nischwitz, Jaroslaw Prohaska, Akos Rathonyi, Christian Schmitz-Steinberg, Heinz Schorlemmer, Eugen Schuhmacher, Josef Sieber, Henry R. Sokal, Luise Ullrich, Gerd Vespermann, Hans Fritz Wilhelm, Richard Wolf and Gertrud Wolle
 Heilsbronn, Heilsbronn Abbey, Burial site of some princes of the Hohenzollern family
 Icking, Burial site of Gert Fröbe, Wilhelm Rode, Ludwig Stiel and Luise Willer
 Ingolstadt, Burial site of Adolf Scherzer
 Irschenberg, Burial site of Ludwig Schmid-Wildy
 Krailling, Burial site of Gustl Bayrhammer, Hans Fitz and Walter Fitz, Hermann Prey, Günther Rennert and Leon Richter
 Miesbach, Waldfriedhof, Burial site of Toni Babl, Lothar Cremer and Max Heimbucher
 Neuendettelsau, Friedhof, Burial site of Wilhelm Löhe
 Nuremberg, 
 Oberaudorf, Burial site of Alix Degrelle-Hirth du Frenes and Walter Rilla
 Oberstdorf, Waldfriedhof, Burial site of Anderl Heckmair, Walter Kalot and Gertrud von Le Fort
 Ottobrunn, Burial site of Karin Hübner
 Planegg, Burial site of Werner Kleine, Maria von Tasnady and Géza von Radványi, Karl Valentin and Berta Böheim-Valentin
 Pullach, Burial site of Michl Lang, Gertrude Kappel-Vukas and Edmund Kunath
 Rehau, Friedhof, Burial site of victims of Helmbrechts concentration camp
 Rosenheim, Burial site of Paul Hartmann, Willy Rösner, Johann Klepper, Alfred Heurich and Walter Gorn
 Rott am Inn, Burial site of Franz-Josef Strauß
 Rottach-Egern, Burial site of Hedwig Courths-Mahler, Bernt Engelmann, Ludwig Ganghofer, Alexander Golling, Leo Slezak and Walter Slezak and Margarethe Slezak-Winter, Alexander Spoerl, Heinrich Spoerl and Ludwig Thoma
 Schliersee, Burial site of Magda Lena Achmann, Werner Bochmann, Jenny Haibel and Willy Haibel, Georg Jennerwein, Bernd Scholz, Franz Seitz Jr. and Franz Seitz Sr., Hans Terofal and Xaver Terofal and Alois Wolf
 Straßberg, Burial site of Roy Black
 Straßlach, Burial site of Erik Schumann
 Tegernsee, Burial site of Michael Dengg, Ferdinand Feldigl, Ernst Lochmann, Winnie Markus and Adi Vogel, Oskar Messter and Hans Schabel-Dengg
 Traunreut, Burial site of Brigitte Koesters and Hans Heinz Koesters
 Tutzing, Burial site of Zdenka Faßbender, Elly Ney, Benno Sterzenbach, Heinrich Vogl and Therese Vogl
 Unterhaching, Burial site of Amadeus August, Paula Braend, Hans Drechsler, Manfred Ott and Fritz Straßner
 Weißenstadt, Burial site of Peter Beauvais
 Wolfratshausen, Burial site of Ina Gerheim and Gusta Hammer
 Wunsiedel, Friedhof, Burial site of Rudolf Heß
 Würzburg, Burial site of Kurt Mantel

Berlin

 Berlin – Charlottenburg, Friedhof Heerstraße, Burial site of Leo Blech, Karl Bonhoeffer, Horst Buchholz, Tilla Durieux, George Grosz, Maximilian Harden, Hilde Hildebrand, Joachim Ringelnatz and Grethe Weiser.
 Berlin – Charlottenburg, Kaiser-Wilhelm-Gedächtnis-Friedhof, Burial site of John Rabe and Franz Betz
 Berlin – Charlottenburg, British War Cemetery, Heerstraße.
 Berlin – Lichtenberg, Zentralfriedhof Friedrichsfelde. Burial site of Rosa Luxemburg, Karl Liebknecht.
 Berlin – Mitte, Invalidenfriedhof. Burial site of Reinhard Heydrich, Fritz Todt, Gerhard von Scharnhorst, Manfred von Richthofen temporary, Hans von Seeckt, Werner von Fritsch, Karl von Bulow, Ernst Udet, Werner Moelders, Helmuth von Moltke, Alfred von Schlieffen
 Berlin – Nikolassee, Waldfriedhof Zehlendorf. Burial site of Willy Brandt and Tatjana Gsovsky.
 Berlin – Schöneberg, Städtischer Friedhof III. Burial site of Marlene Dietrich and Helmut Newton.
 Berlin – Weißensee, Weißensee Cemetery. One of the largest old Jewish cemeteries in Europe.
 Berlin – Zehlendorf (Berlin), St Annen Friedhof, Dahlem Dorf. Burial site of Rudi Dutschke.
 Berlin – Zehlendorf, Waldfriedhof Dahlem, Hüttenweg. Burial site of Gottfried Benn, Karl Hofer, Bernd Rosemeyer and Werner Sombart.

Hamburg
 Hamburg, Hauptfriedhof Ohlsdorf (Ohlsdorf Main Cemetery), with 4.05 km2 largest cemetery on Earth.

Lower Saxony (Niedersachsen)
 Becklingen War Cemetery (CWGC)
 Norden

North Rhine-Westphalia (Nordrhein-Westfalen)

 Balve, for Russian soldiers

Rhineland-Palatinate (Rheinland-Pfalz)
 Worms, Jewish Cemetery in Worms

Saxony (Sachsen)
 Dresden, 
 Dresden, the oldest remaining cemetery in the city
 Dresden – Loschwitz, Loschwitz Cemetery, the current cemetery, in two parts, opened in about 1800, when the older Loschwitz Church Cemetery became full
 Dresden – Tolkewitz, the main cemetery, associated with the Evangelical Church, has been joined by the municipal  since 1911
 Dresden, Nordfriedhof, originally for military burials now operating as a public cemetery
 Herrnhut, God's Acre, the original Moravian graveyard on the hill "Hutberg"
 Leipzig, the Südfriedhof (Leipzig), one of the largest park-like cemeteries in Germany

Schleswig-Holstein
 Lübeck, Burgtor-Friedhof
 Rendsburg, Garnisonsfriedhof